"Only Thinking" is a song by New Zealand group Mi-Sex, released in October 1983 as the lead single from their fourth studio album, Where Do They Go? (1983). The song peaked at number 48 in Australia.

Track listings
Australia/New Zealand 7" (BA 223106)
 "Only Thinking" 	
 "The Name Game"

North America 7" (Epic AS 1852)
 "Only Thinking" - 4:01
 "Where Do They Go?" - 4:18

Charts

References

New Zealand pop songs
Mi-Sex songs
1983 singles
1983 songs
CBS Records singles